The 1999 Nigerian Senate election in Osun State was held on February 20, 1999, to elect members of the Nigerian Senate to represent Osun State. Moji Akinfenwa representing Osun East, Sunday Fajinmi representing Osun West and Adebayo Salami representing Osun Central all won on the platform of the Alliance for Democracy.

Overview

Summary

Results

Osun East 
The election was won by Moji Akinfenwa of the Alliance for Democracy.

Osun West 
The election was won by Sunday Fajinmi of the Alliance for Democracy.

Osun Central 
The election was won by Adebayo Salami of the Alliance for Democracy.

References 

February 1999 events in Nigeria
osu
Osun State Senate elections